Joop Tinkhof (born 22 March 1938) is a Dutch volleyball player. He competed in the men's tournament at the 1964 Summer Olympics.

References

1938 births
Living people
Dutch men's volleyball players
Olympic volleyball players of the Netherlands
Volleyball players at the 1964 Summer Olympics
People from Banda Aceh